The 2008 EAFF East Asian Football Championship was held between 17 February and 23 February 2008.  The preliminary competitions were held from 25 March to 24 June 2007.

Participating teams

Preliminary

Stage One

Stage Two

 - Winner of Preliminary Competition Stage One

Finals
 - 2005 East Asian Football Championship Winners
 - Winner of Preliminary Competition Stage Two
 - 2006 FIFA World Cup participating team
 - 2006 FIFA World Cup participating team

Venues

Preliminary Competition

Final Tournament

Preliminary Competition

Stage One

Guam won over Northern Mariana Islands by an aggregate of 12–2 and advanced to stage two of the preliminary competition.

Stage Two
The top team of each group qualifies for the final match. The champion of the Preliminary Competition qualifies for the Final Competition.

Group A

Group B

Playoff for Fifth Place

Playoff for Third Place

Final of Stage Two

Awards

Final Tournament

Squads

Matches Detail

All times, local time

Personal Awards

Final standing

External links
East Asian Football Championship 2008 Final Competition in China
EAFC 2008 Preliminary Competition Results
Teams in the East Asian Cup 2008

East
East Asian Football Championship, 2008
2008
2008
2007 in Chinese football
2008 in Chinese football